7th Street is a street located in the Johannesburg suburb of Melville. It is lined with many restaurants and bars, which are mostly frequented by students from the nearby University of Johannesburg. It is featured in the South African soap opera 7de Laan.

See also
 List of restaurant districts and streets

References 

Streets and roads of Johannesburg
Tourist attractions in Johannesburg
Restaurant districts and streets in South Africa